Ryan Donato (born April 9, 1996) is an American professional ice hockey forward who is currently playing for the Seattle Kraken of the National Hockey League (NHL). He was selected by the Boston Bruins in the second round, 56th overall, in the 2014 NHL Entry Draft. He has previously played for the Boston Bruins, Minnesota Wild and San Jose Sharks. Donato is the son of former Bruins and longtime NHL player Ted Donato. On October 12, 2021, Donato scored the first goal in Seattle Kraken franchise history in a 4–3 loss against the Vegas Golden Knights.

Playing career

Early career
Donato played high school hockey with Dexter School in Massachusetts. He was selected in the second round, 56th overall, by the Boston Bruins in the 2014 NHL Entry Draft.

Continuing to play with Dexter, Donato made his junior debut with the South Shore Kings in the United States Premier Hockey League before finishing with the Omaha Lancers of the United States Hockey League, having committed to a collegiate career with Harvard University, in following his father's footsteps who was now the Crimson's head coach.

Professional

Boston Bruins
Having led the Crimson as a junior in scoring through the 2017–18 season with 26 goals and 17 assists for 43 points in just 29 games, Donato opted to leave the college early and turn professional. He signed a three-year, entry-level contract with the Bruins on March 18, 2018. Despite leaving college hockey, Donato was still enrolled in Harvard classes and was aiming to finish the semester while playing in the NHL. He made his NHL debut the next day where he recorded his first NHL goal and added two assists in a 5–4 overtime loss to the Columbus Blue Jackets. Donato made his playoff debut during Game 2 of the 2018 Stanley Cup playoffs in a 7–3 win over the Toronto Maple Leafs.

Donato began the 2018–19 season with the Bruins. On November 1, he was assigned to the Bruins' American Hockey League (AHL) affiliate, the Providence Bruins after playing in 11 games. He was recalled by Boston on November 28 after recording nine points in 10 games for Providence. Donato was reassigned to Providence on January 28, 2019.

Minnesota Wild
On February 20, 2019, Donato and a 2019 conditional fifth-round pick were traded to the Minnesota Wild in exchange for Charlie Coyle. He made his debut for the Wild on February 21, recording two assists in a 4–1 win over the New York Rangers.

On July 16, 2019, the Wild re-signed Donato to a two-year, $3.8 million contract extension.

San Jose Sharks
On October 5, 2020, Donato was traded by the Wild to the San Jose Sharks in exchange for Pittsburgh's 2021 third-round pick. His debut came on January 14, 2021, in a 4–3 shootout win over the Arizona Coyotes.

Seattle Kraken
On September 12, 2021, the expansion team Seattle Kraken signed Donato as a free agent to a one-year, $750,000 contract for the  season.

Donato scored the opening goal in the franchise's first preseason game against the Vancouver Canucks on September 26, 2021. He followed that up with the first official goal in Seattle Kraken franchise history, scoring on opening night in a 4–3 loss to the Vegas Golden Knights on October 12, 2021. Donato scored a career-high 16 goals and added 15 assists for 31 points in 74 games, as Seattle missed the playoffs in their inaugural season.

As an impending restricted free agent, Donato was not tendered a qualifying offer by the Kraken and was released as a free agent. On July 27, 2022, after testing the market he was re-signed by the Kraken to a one-year, $1.2 million contract.

International play

Donato made his first appearance at the international level as a junior when he was selected by the United States to participate in the 2016 World Junior Championships. He finished the tournament with 3 goals and 4 points in 7 games, resulting in a bronze medal.

Donato was selected for the United States men's national ice hockey team, to compete in the men's tournament at the 2018 Winter Olympics. Donato led the United States in scoring, with six points; additionally, his five goals place him in a tie for the most goals scored – alongside Ilya Kovalchuk and Kirill Kaprizov. However, the team's overall performance was a disappointment as team USA skated to a seventh-place finish.

Career statistics

Regular season and playoffs

International

Awards and honors

References

External links

1996 births
Living people
American men's ice hockey centers
Boston Bruins draft picks
Boston Bruins players
Harvard Crimson men's ice hockey players
Ice hockey players from Massachusetts
Ice hockey players at the 2018 Winter Olympics
Iowa Wild players
Minnesota Wild players
Olympic ice hockey players of the United States
Omaha Lancers players
People from Scituate, Massachusetts
Providence Bruins players
Seattle Kraken players
Sportspeople from Plymouth County, Massachusetts
AHCA Division I men's ice hockey All-Americans